Bad Black is a 2016 Ugandan action-comedy film written, produced, and directed by Isaac Godfrey Geoffrey Nabwana (IGG), in Wakaliwood, an ultra low-budget studio in Kampala, Uganda.

Plot
In the slums of Kampala, Uganda, a young girl runs away from home and ends up in a child trafficking ring led by a former Uganda People's Defence Force commando. One day, while collecting metal scraps, she is viciously assaulted by multi-millionaire Hirigi when she mistakenly takes the tire iron of his van. After enduring weeks of abuse and witnessing other children being murdered in cold blood, the girl takes matters into her own hands and kills the ring leader.

Ten years later, the girl has grown up to become "Bad Black", leader of the biggest crime syndicate in Kampala. Meanwhile, Alan Ssali, an American doctor whose parents were U.S. Army commandos, is in Kampala giving aid to the people of the slums. He encounters Bad Black, who mistakes him for a commando due to his designer dog tags. After receiving Alan's business card, Bad Black sneaks into his hotel and steals his money and passport. When the police refuse to help him, Alan receives kung fu commando training from his young assistant "Wesley Snipes" before storming through the slums to look for Bad Black. Elsewhere, Bad Black seduces Hirigi to exact her revenge on him.

One day, a drug deal between Bad Black and a rival syndicate is disrupted by Kampala Police forces. The gangsters frantically run away from the cops, only to be gunned down by Alan, who corners Bad Black and recovers his dog tags before handing her to the police. Her subordinates storm into the prison and spring her out, along with their captured comrades and other inmates. Bad Black, however, decides to stay in prison to ensure the safety of another female inmate, who is to be released in two days. On the day of that inmate's release, Bad Black is put on trial for extorting Hirigi. As Bad Black is about to prove her innocence, the film suddenly fast-forwards to a flashback, when her father Swaz robbed a bank to pay for her mother Flavia's medical expenses, but was killed in a gunfight with the police and Flavia died shortly after childbirth. Just as Bad Black tells the court of her reasons for living a life of crime, Flavia suddenly arrives and embraces her daughter, forcing the judge to adjourn the court.

Three months later, Alan resumes his medical mission in Wakaliga, but with Bad Black as his nurse. Hirigi's wife suddenly appears and opens fire at the medical camp, killing Alan in the process.

Cast 

 Nalwanga Gloria as Bad Black
 Kirabo Beatrice as young Bad Black
 Alan Ssali Hofmanis as Doctor Alan Ssali
 Bisaso Dauda as Hirigi
 Nakaye Janati as Mukyala Hiriji
 Kasule Rolean as Wesley Snipes
 Ssebankyaye Mohammed as Swaz
 Mugisha Henry as Buddy Spencer
 Nabatanzi Hawah as Flavia
 Nakatudde Madinah as young Flavia
 Kabuye John as Chairman
 Nattembo Racheal as Racheal
 Okello Joseph as Cobra
 Namatovu Annet as Maama Black
 Muhumuza as the Judge
 VJ Emmie as the voice of Video Joker

Release and reception 
Bad Black had its world premiere at the 2016 Fantastic Fest, where it won the Audience Award and Nabwana IGG won the Best Director award for Action Features.

The film was released alongside Who Killed Captain Alex? in the Wakaliwood Supa Action Vol. 1 Blu-ray/DVD combo by the American Genre Film Archive (AGFA) on 14 May 2019. The Blu-ray release features the option to watch Who Killed Captain Alex? with or without the VJ Emmie narration, plus subtitles in 40 languages, and welcome videos by Nabwana IGG for 14 countries.

Much like Who Killed Captain Alex?, Bad Black was generally received well by critics and audiences alike. Richard Kuipers of Variety called the film "A no-budget brew of comedy, action and wisecracking voiceover narration by self-taught Ugandan filmmaker Nabwana I.G.G."

Bad Black was a critical and audience favorite at the 2017 Seattle International Film Festival. The film earned an encore presentation on the last day of the festival, making the total number of screenings four. The Seattle audience question and answer session with the director was on Skype.

References

External links
 
 
 

2016 films
2016 martial arts films
2010s martial arts comedy films
English-language Ugandan films
Films about drugs
Films about human trafficking
Films about orphans
Films about poverty
Films about revenge
Films set in Uganda
Films set in prison
Films shot in Uganda
Kung fu films
2016 comedy films
2010s English-language films